The 1985 E3 Harelbeke was the 28th edition of the Belgian E3 Harelbeke cycle race, held on 30 March 1985. The race started and finished in the city of Harelbeke, West Flanders. The race was won by Phil Anderson of the Panasonic team.

General classification

References

1985 in Belgian sport
1985